

Events
January 23 – The 31st Seoul Music Awards are held in South Korea, hosted by Kim Sung-joo, Boom, and Kim Seol-hyun. Winners include NCT 127, Lim Young-woong and BTS.
February – Punjabi hip hop singer Sidhu Moose Wala faces a court case for contravening the election code of conduct while a candidate for the Indian National Congress.
April 11 – Sidhu Moose Wala's latest single insults some of the voters responsible for his failure in the 2022 Punjab state assembly elections.
May 19 – The family of Balwinder Safri, Indian banghra singer from Birmingham, ask New Cross Hospital not to switch off his dialysis machine while he is in a coma after suffering brain damage during an operation.
July 19 – Balwinder Safri is reported to have made a "miracle recovery" after several months in a coma. 
July 28 – During a concert by Cantopop dance group Mirror in the Hong Kong Coliseum, an overhead screen falls onto the stage, injuring two on stage.
October 14 – Asia Song Festival is held at Yeouido Park in Seoul and features performers from South Korea, Japan, Philippines, Vietnam, Indonesia, Thailand and Kazakhstan.

Albums
Onewe (South Korea) – Planet Nine: Voyager (January 4)
Hikaru Utada (Japan) – Bad Mode (January 19)
Boris (Japan) – W (January 21)
Confess (Iran) – Revenge at All Costs (January 21) 
Scandal (Japan) – MIRROR (January 26)
Bloodywood (India) – Rakshak (February 18)
Koda Kumi (Japan) – Heart (March 2)
Nigo (Japan) – I Know Nigo! (March 25)
Lim Young-woong (South Korea) – Im Hero
Stray Kids (Japan) – Circus (June 22)

Classical
Unsuk Chin (South Korea) – Scherben der Stille (Shards of Silence), for violin and orchestra
Huang Ruo (China) – A Dust in Time (first recording)

Film, TV and video game scores
Hideyuki Fukasawa - Orient (Japan)
Anup Rubens - Bangarraju (India - Telugu)

Musical filmsIshrat Made in China (Pakistan), score by Shani Arshad with music by various artistsLaal Singh Chaddha (India - Hindi), with music by Pritam and lyrics by Amitabh Bhattacharya.Ponniyin Selvan: I (India - Tamil), with music by A. R. Rahman

Deaths
January 2 – , 54, Indonesian singer, actress and TV presenter.
January 8 – Sornphet Sornsuphan, 73, Thai luk thung singer.
January 9 – Desmond de Silva, 78, Sri Lankan singer
January 17 – Neela Wickramasinghe, 71, Sri Lankan singer and composer
February 1 – Hiroshima, Japanese drummer (G.I.S.M.) (death announced on this date)
February 6 – Lata Mangeshkar, 92, Indian playback singer
February 16 
Dorce Gamalama, 58, Indonesian singer and television presenter (COVID-19)
Bappi Lahiri, 69, Indian singer, composer and record producer (complications from obstructive sleep apnea)
February 22 
 Muvaffak "Maffy" Falay, 92, Turkish trumpeter
 Jayananda Lama, 65, Nepalese folk singer and actor
March 13 – Li Guangxi, 92, Chinese operatic tenor
March 22 – Eva Castillo, 52, Filipina singer
March 25 – Keith Martin, 55, Filipino singer
March 30 – Jun Lopito, 64, Filipino guitarist
April 6 – Wen Hsia, 93, Taiwanese singer and actor
April 8 – Nagai Sriram, 41, Indian Carnatic violinist
April 15 – Koji, 49, Japanese guitarist of kei rock band La'cryma Christi (esophageal cancer)
April 17 – Prafulla Kar, 83, Indian Oriya singer, songwriter and musician
May 10 – Shivkumar Sharma, 84, Indian composer and santoor player
May 29
, 99, Chinese opera performer.
Sidhu Moose Wala, 28, Indian Punjabi singer, actor and politician (shot)
May 31 – KK, 53, Indian playback singer (heart attack)
June 8 – Song Hae, 95, South Korean television host and singer
June 18 – Adibah Noor, 51, Malaysian singer and actress (ovarian cancer)
June 23 – Yuri Shatunov, 48, Russian singer (heart attack)
July 3 – Miu Chu, 40, Taiwanese singer (breast cancer)
July 8 – Alam Khan, 78, Bangladeshi composer (lung cancer)
July 13 – Rubina Qureshi, 81, Pakistani Sindhi classical singer
July 18 – Bhupinder Singh, 82, Indian ghazal'' singer
July 26 – Balwinder Safri, 63, Indian folk singer
July 31 – Nirmala Mishra, 83, Tollywood playback singer
August 11 
 Mohamed Huzam, 52, Maldivian playback singer
 Shimoga Subbanna, 83, Indian Kannada playback singer
August 12 – Ebrahim Qanbari-Mehr, 93, Iranian musical instrument maker
August 20 – Nayyara Noor, 71, Pakistani playback singer
August 27 – Georges Al Rassi, 42, Lebanese actor, singer and songwriter (car accident)
August 29 – John P. Varkey, 52, Indian guitarist, songwriter and composer
September 10 – Choichi Terukina, 90, Japanese Ryukyuan musician and sanshin player
October 7 – Toshi Ichiyanagi, 89, Japanese pianist and composer
December 9 
 Jovit Baldivino, 29, Filipino singer and actor (intracranial aneurysm)
 Qamar Gula, 70, Afghan Pashto language singer
December 10 – Sulochana Chavan, 89, Indian Marathi singer
December 10 – Nihal Nelson, 76, Sri Lankan vocalist, songwriter and composer

By country 
 2022 in Chinese music
 2022 in Japanese music
 2022 in Philippine music
 2022 in South Korean music

See also 
 2022 in music

References 

Asia
Asian music
2022 in Asia